Small intestinal bacterial overgrowth (SIBO), also termed bacterial overgrowth, or small bowel bacterial overgrowth syndrome (SBBOS), is a disorder of excessive bacterial growth in the small intestine. Unlike the colon (or large bowel), which is rich with bacteria, the small bowel usually has fewer than 100,000 organisms per millilitre. Patients with bacterial overgrowth typically develop symptoms which may include nausea, bloating, vomiting, diarrhea, malnutrition, weight loss and malabsorption, which is caused by a number of mechanisms.

The diagnosis of bacterial overgrowth is made by a number of techniques, with the gold standard being an aspirate from the jejunum that grows in excess of 105 bacteria per millilitre. Risk factors for the development of bacterial overgrowth include dysmotility; anatomical disturbances in the bowel, including fistulae, diverticula and blind loops created after surgery, and resection of the ileo-cecal valve; gastroenteritis-induced alterations to the small intestine; and the use of certain medications, including proton pump inhibitors.

Small bowel bacterial overgrowth syndrome is treated with an elemental diet or antibiotics, which may be given in a cyclic fashion to prevent tolerance to the antibiotics, sometimes followed by prokinetic drugs to prevent recurrence if dysmotility is a suspected cause.

Signs and symptoms
Symptoms traditionally linked to SIBO include bloating, diarrhea, constipation, and abdominal pain/discomfort. Steatorrhea may be seen in more severe cases.
Bacterial overgrowth can cause a variety of symptoms, many of which are also found in other conditions, making the diagnosis challenging at times. Many of the symptoms are due to malabsorption of nutrients due to the effects of bacteria which either metabolize nutrients or cause inflammation of the small bowel, impairing absorption. The symptoms of bacterial overgrowth include nausea, flatus, constipation, bloating, abdominal distension, abdominal pain or discomfort, diarrhea, fatigue, and weakness. SIBO also causes an increased permeability of the small intestine. Some patients may lose weight. Children with bacterial overgrowth may develop malnutrition and have difficulty attaining proper growth. Steatorrhea, a sticky type of diarrhea where fats are not properly absorbed and spill into the stool, may also occur.

Patients with bacterial overgrowth that is longstanding can develop complications of their illness as a result of malabsorption of nutrients. Laboratory test results may include elevated folate, and, less commonly, vitamin B12 deficiency or other nutritional deficiencies. Anemia may occur from a variety of mechanisms, as many of the nutrients involved in production of red blood cells are absorbed in the affected small bowel. Iron is absorbed in the more proximal parts of the small bowel, the duodenum and jejunum, and patients with malabsorption of iron can develop a microcytic anemia, with small red blood cells. Vitamin B12 is absorbed in the last part of the small bowel, the ileum, and patients who malabsorb vitamin B12 can develop a megaloblastic anemia with large red blood cells.

Related conditions
In recent years, several proposed links between SIBO and other disorders have been made. However, the usual methodology of these studies involves the use of breath testing as an indirect investigation for SIBO. Breath testing has been criticized by some authors for being an imperfect test for SIBO, with multiple known false positives.

Irritable bowel syndrome
Some studies reported up to 80% of patients with irritable bowel syndrome (IBS) have SIBO (using the hydrogen breath test). IBS-D is associated with elevated hydrogen numbers on breath tests while IBS-C is associated with elevated methane numbers on breath tests. Subsequent studies demonstrated statistically significant reduction in IBS symptoms following therapy for SIBO.

Various mechanisms are involved in the development of diarrhea and IBS-D in bacterial overgrowth. First, the excessive bacterial concentrations can cause direct inflammation of the small bowel cells, leading to an inflammatory diarrhea. The malabsorption of lipids, proteins and carbohydrates may cause poorly digestible products to enter into the colon. This can cause diarrhea by the osmotic drive of these molecules, but can also stimulate the secretory mechanisms of colonic cells, leading to a secretory diarrhea.

There is a lack of consensus however, regarding the suggested link between IBS and SIBO. Other authors concluded that the abnormal breath results so common in IBS patients do not suggest SIBO, and state that "abnormal fermentation timing and dynamics of the breath test findings support a role for abnormal intestinal bacterial distribution in IBS." There is general consensus that breath tests are abnormal in IBS; however, the disagreement lies in whether this is representative of SIBO.

Cause

Certain people are more predisposed to the development of bacterial overgrowth because of certain risk factors.  These factors can be grouped into four categories: (1) disordered motility or movement of the small bowel or anatomical changes that lead to stasis, (2) disorders in the immune system, (3) interference with the production of proteolytic enzymes, gastric acid, or bile, and (4) conditions that cause more bacteria from the colon to enter the small bowel.
In some people, methanogens may reside in the oral cavity, as evidenced by reductions in breath methane levels following mouthwash with chlorhexidine. This may affect results from hydrogen-methane breath testing.

Absence or impairment of the migrating motor complex (MMC), a cyclical motility pattern in the small intestine, and phase III of the MMC in particular, is associated with the development of SIBO. Problems with motility may either be diffuse, or localized to particular areas.

MMC impairment may be a result of post-infectious irritable bowel syndrome, drug use, or intestinal pseudo-obstruction among other causes. There is an overlap in findings between tropical sprue, post-infectious irritable bowel syndrome and small intestinal bacterial overgrowth in the pathophysiology of the three conditions and also SIBO can similarly sometimes be triggered by an acute gastrointestinal infection. As of 2020, there is still controversy about the role of SIBO in the pathogenesis of common functional symptoms such as those considered to be components of irritable bowel syndrome. Diseases like scleroderma cause diffuse slowing of the bowel, leading to increased bacterial concentrations. More commonly, the small bowel may have anatomical problems, such as out-pouchings known as diverticula that can cause bacteria to accumulate. After surgery involving the stomach and duodenum (most commonly with Billroth II antrectomy), a blind loop may be formed, leading to stasis of flow of intestinal contents. This can cause overgrowth, and is termed blind loop syndrome.

Systemic or metabolic disorders may lead to conditions allowing bacterial overgrowth as well. For example, diabetes can cause intestinal neuropathy, pancreatitis leading to pancreatic insufficiency can impair digestive enzyme production, and bile may be affected as part of cirrhosis of the liver. Proton pump inhibitors, a class of medication that are used to reduce stomach acid, is associated with an increased risk of developing SIBO.

Finally, abnormal connections between the bacteria-rich colon and the small bowel can increase the bacterial load in the small bowel. Patients with Crohn's disease or other diseases of the ileum may require surgery that removes the ileocecal valve connecting the small and large bowel; this leads to an increased reflux of bacteria into the small bowel. After bariatric surgery for obesity, connections between the stomach and the ileum can be formed, which may increase bacterial load in the small bowel.

Diagnosis

The diagnosis of bacterial overgrowth can be made by physicians in various ways. Malabsorption can be detected by a test called the D-xylose absorption test. Xylose is a sugar that does not require enzymes to be digested. The D-xylose test involves having a patient drink a certain quantity of D-xylose, and measuring levels in the urine and blood; if there is no evidence of D-xylose in the urine and blood, it suggests that the small bowel is not absorbing properly (as opposed to problems with enzymes required for digestion).

The gold standard for detection of bacterial overgrowth is the aspiration of more than 105 bacteria per millilitre from the small bowel. The normal small bowel has less than 104 bacteria per millilitre. Some experts however, consider aspiration of more than 103 positive if the flora is predominately colonic type bacteria as these types of bacteria are considered pathological in excessive numbers in the small intestine. The reliability of aspiration in the diagnosis of SIBO has been questioned as SIBO can be patchy and the reproducibility can be as low as 38 percent. Breath tests have their own reliability problems with a high rate of false positive. Some doctors factor in a patients' response to treatment as part of the diagnosis.

Breath tests have been developed to test for bacterial overgrowth. These tests are either based on bacterial metabolism of carbohydrates to hydrogen, methane, or hydrogen sulfide, or based on the detection of by-products of digestion of carbohydrates that are not usually metabolized. The hydrogen breath test involves having the patient fast for a minimum of 12 hours then having them drink a substrate usually glucose or lactulose, then measuring expired hydrogen and methane concentrations typically over a period of several hours. It compares well to jejunal aspirates in making the diagnosis of bacterial overgrowth. Carbon-13 (13C) and carbon-14 (14C) based tests have also been developed based on the bacterial metabolism of D-xylose. Increased bacterial concentrations are also involved in the deconjugation of bile acids. The glycocholic acid breath test involves the administration of the bile acid 14C glycocholic acid, and the detection of 14CO2, which would be elevated in bacterial overgrowth.

However, some physicians suggest that if the suspicion of bacterial overgrowth is high enough, the best diagnostic test is a trial of treatment.  If the symptoms improve, an empiric diagnosis of bacterial overgrowth can be made.

There is insufficient evidence to support the use of inflammatory markers, such as fecal calprotectin, to detect SIBO.

Definition
SIBO may be defined as an increased number of bacteria measured via exhaled hydrogen and/or methane gas following the ingestion of glucose, or via analysis of small bowel aspirate fluid. Nevertheless, as of 2020, the definition of SIBO as a clinical entity lacks precision and consistency; it is a term generally applied to a clinical disorder where symptoms, clinical signs, and/or laboratory abnormalities are attributed to changes in the numbers of bacteria or in the composition of the bacterial population in the small intestine. The main obstacle to accurately define SIBO is limited understanding of the normal intestinal microbial population. Future advances in sampling technology and techniques for counting bacterial populations and their metabolites should provide much-needed clarity.

Methane-dominant SIBO 
The archaeon Methanobrevibacter smithii, has been associated with symptoms of SIBO which result in a positive methane breath test. In addition to the archaeon, a few bacteria can also produce methane, such as members of the Clostridium and Bacteroides genus. Production of methane therefore, may not be bacterial, nor limited to the small intestine, and it has been proposed that the condition should be classified as a separate 'intestinal methanogen overgrowth' (IMO).

Treatment
Treatment strategies should focus on identifying and correcting the root causes, where possible, resolving nutritional deficiencies, and administering antibiotics. This is especially important for patients with indigestion and malabsorption. Although whether antibiotics should be a first line treatment is a matter of debate. Some experts recommend probiotics as first line therapy with antibiotics being reserved as a second line treatment for more severe cases of SIBO. Prokinetic drugs are other options but research in humans is limited. A variety of antibiotics, including tetracycline, amoxicillin-clavulanate, metronidazole, neomycin, cephalexin and trimethoprim-sulfamethoxazole have been used; however, the best evidence is for the use of rifaximin, a poorly-absorbed antibiotic. Although irritable bowel syndrome has been shown to respond to the treatment of poorly-absorbed antibiotics, there is limited evidence on the effectiveness of such treatment in cases of SIBO, and as of 2020, randomized controlled trials are still needed to further confirm the eradicating effect of such treatment in SIBO.
A course of one week of antibiotics is usually sufficient to treat the condition. However, if the condition recurs, antibiotics can be given in a cyclical fashion in order to prevent tolerance. For example, antibiotics may be given for a week, followed by three weeks off antibiotics, followed by another week of treatment. Alternatively, the choice of antibiotic used can be cycled. There is still limited data to guide the clinician in developing antibiotic strategies for SIBO. Therapy remains, for the most part, empiric. However, concerns exist about the potential risks of long-term broad-spectrum antibiotic therapy.

Probiotics are bacterial preparations that alter the bacterial flora in the bowel to cause a beneficial effect. Animal research has demonstrated that probiotics have barrier enhancing, antibacterial, immune modulating and anti-inflammatory effects which may have a positive effect in the management of SIBO in humans. Lactobacillus casei has been found to be effective in improving breath hydrogen scores after 6 weeks of treatment presumably by suppressing levels of a small intestinal bacterial overgrowth of fermenting bacteria. The multi-strain preparation VSL#3 was found to be effective in suppressing SIBO. Lactobacillus plantarum, Lactobacillus acidophilus, and Lactobacillus casei have all demonstrated effectiveness in the treatment and management of SIBO. Conversely, Lactobacillus fermentum and Saccharomyces boulardii have been found to be ineffective. A combination of Lactobacillus plantarum and Lactobacillus rhamnosus has been found to be effective in suppressing bacterial overgrowth of abnormal gas producing organisms in the small intestine.

Probiotics are superior to antibiotics in the treatment of SIBO. A combination of probiotic strains has been found to produce better results than therapy with the antibiotic drug metronidazole.

An elemental diet has been shown to be highly effective for eliminating SIBO with a two-week diet demonstrating 80% efficacy and a three-week diet demonstrating 85% efficacy. An elemental diet works via providing nutrition for the individual while depriving the bacteria of a food source. Additional treatment options include the use of prokinetic drugs such as 5-HT4 receptor agonists or motilin agonists to extend the SIBO free period after treatment with an elemental diet or antibiotics. A diet void of certain foods that feed the bacteria can help alleviate the symptoms. For example, if the symptoms are caused by bacterial overgrowth feeding on indigestible carbohydrate rich foods, following a FODMAP restriction diet may help.

References

External links 

Bacteria and humans
Gastrointestinal tract disorders
Steatorrhea-related diseases
Syndromes